Balgownie may refer to:

Balgownie, New South Wales
Brig o' Balgownie, Aberdeen
Balgonie Castle, Fife